Two ships of the United States Navy have borne the name USS Vindicator.

 , was a sidewheel steam ram, launched in 1863 and struck in 1865.
 , was an ocean surveillance ship, launched in 1984 and struck in 1993.

United States Navy ship names